Dichomeris ostensella is a moth in the family Gelechiidae. It was described by Francis Walker in 1864. It is found in Guyana and Amazonas, Brazil.

Adults are coal black, the forewings with a deep cupreous-black patch in the disc and a submarginal band of the same colour. There are two intermediate black cinereous-bordered dots and a few minute black marginal dots. The hindwings are dark cupreous.

References

Moths described in 1864
ostensella